The Australian Bureau of Statistics (ABS) is the independent statutory agency of the Australian Government responsible for statistical collection and analysis and for giving evidence-based advice to federal, state and territory governments. The ABS collects and analyses statistics on economic, population, environmental and social issues, publishing many on their website. The ABS also operates the national Census of Population and Housing that occurs every five years.

History
In 1901, statistics were collected by each state for their individual use. While attempts were made to coordinate collections through an annual Conference of Statisticians, it was quickly realized that a National Statistical Office would be required to develop nationally comparable statistics.

The Commonwealth Bureau of Census and Statistics (CBCS) was established under the Census and Statistics Act in 1905. Sir George Knibbs was appointed as the first Commonwealth Statistician. Initially, the bureau was located in Melbourne and was attached to the Department of Home Affairs. In 1928, the bureau relocated to Canberra and in 1932 moved to the Treasury portfolio.

Initially, the states maintained their own statistical offices and worked together with the CBCS to produce national data. However, some states found it difficult to resource a state statistical office to the level required for an adequate statistical service. In 1924 the Tasmanian Statistical Office transferred to the Commonwealth. On 20 August 1957, the NSW Bureau of Statistics was merged into the Commonwealth Bureau. Unification of the state statistical offices with the CBCS was finally achieved in the late 1950s under the stewardship of Sir Stanley Carver, who was both NSW Statistician and Acting Commonwealth Statistician.

In 1974 the CBCS was abolished and the Australian Bureau of Statistics (ABS) was established in its place. The Australian Bureau of Statistics Act established the ABS as a statutory authority in 1975, headed by the Australian Statistician and responsible to the Treasurer.

Organizational vision and values
The ABS purpose is to "inform Australia's important decisions by partnering and innovating to deliver relevant, trusted, objective data, statistics and insights".

The ABS values work in conjunction with the broader Australian Public Service (APS) values and include impartiality, commitment to service, accountability, respect and ethical behaviour.

Modernization
From 2015, an investment of $250 million over five years by the Australian government is being used to modernize ABS systems and processes, with the aim of delivering the best possible statistical program in more efficient and innovative ways.

Census of Population and Housing

The ABS undertakes the Australian Census of Population and Housing. The census is conducted every five years under federal law and the Constitution of Australia.

The most recent Census of Population and Housing was conducted on 10 August 2021. Statistics from the census were published on the ABS website on 28 June 2022.

The census is the largest statistical collection undertaken by the ABS and one of the most important. The census aims to accurately measure the number of people and dwellings in Australia on census night and a range of their key characteristics. This information is used to inform public policy as well as electoral boundaries, infrastructure planning and the provision of community services.

2021 Census 
The last Census was on Tuesday 10 August 2021. The 2021 Census achieved a response rate above the Australian Bureau of Statistics target obtaining data from 10 million (10,852,208) dwellings during the height of the global COVID-19 pandemic. The dwelling response rate was 96.1 per cent, up from 95.1 per cent in 2016. Census data can be accessed using a number of Census data tools. 

The Statistical Independent Assurance Panel, established by the Australian Statistician to provide assurance of Census data quality, concluded that the 2021 Census data is fit-for-purpose, is of comparable quality to the 2011 and 2016 Censuses and can be used with confidence.

2016 census

In 2016, the ABS took steps to conduct the census largely online through their website and logins, rather than through traditional paper forms. The 2016 census was unavailable for 43 hours, from 7:30 pm on August 9, due to a series of events which prompted the ABS to take the form offline. The chief statistician, David Kalisch, said the website was closed after multiple denial-of-service attacks targeted the online form. The Australian Signals Directorate (ASD) confirmed the incident was a DoS attack and that it did not result in any unauthorised access to or extraction of any personal information.

The online census web page was back up at 2:30 pm on August 11. A Senate inquiry was held into the census events. An independent panel was established by the Australian Statistician to ensure quality of the data from the 2016 census and it was found fit for purpose, comparable to previous Australian and international censuses and able to be used with confidence.

Work program
The ABS has an extensive work program covering a vast range of topics, and releases several hundred publications yearly. Topics include:
 Economy
 Industry
 People
 Labour
 Health
 Environment
 Snapshots of Australia.

The ABS previously published the Year book, Australia, available on the ABS site under various ISSNs and title iterations (Commonwealth yearbook, Official yearbook of the Commonwealth of Australia). It was first published in 1908 and ceased in 2012.

Main economic indicators
The ABS publishes a suite of monthly and quarterly economic publications that are part of the core of the organization's work program. These statistics are integral to the functioning of Australia's economy and impact areas, such as interest rates, property prices, employment, the value of the Australian dollar, commodity prices and many more areas. Popular publications include:
 Key Economic Indicators
 Consumer Price Index
 Australian National Accounts
 Average Weekly Earnings
 Labour Force

Other major publications 
Outside the main economic indicators, the ABS has a number of other major publications covering topics including:
 Health: The 2011–12 Australian Health Survey was the most comprehensive survey on health and wellbeing ever conducted in Australia. For the first time, the survey also included a biomedical component with respondents having the option of providing biomedical samples such as blood and urine for testing. This allowed the survey to capture detailed health information from Australians such as the prevalence of conditions such as diabetes in the community. Many individuals were subsequently informed that they had medical conditions they were not aware of prior to testing. Another component of the Australian Health Survey asked respondents to keep a food diary which was then used to obtain a rich picture of the nutritional intake and dietary preferences of the nation.
 Crime: The ABS publishes a suite of crime publications including individual releases covering offenders, crime victims, the corrections system and prisons.
 Demography: The ABS publishes a number of demography releases including data on population, population growth and projections, interstate and overseas migration, births, deaths and overseas arrivals and departures.
 Aboriginal and Torres Strait Islander statistics: The National Aboriginal and Torres Strait Islander Social Survey (NATSISS) collects information on the social situation of Indigenous Australians, including on health, education, culture and labour force participation. The ABS also collects data related to Aboriginal and Torres Strait Islanders through the Australian Health Survey as well as in many other regular publications in the areas of demography, education, employment and more.
 Education: The major education publications are Childhood Education and Care, Schools, and Education and Work. They look at all aspects of education in Australia from preschool up to undergraduate and postgraduate study.
 Environment: The ABS has a range of publications on environmental topics covering energy and water use, conservation activities undertaken by households, land management and farming and more. The innovative Land Account publication covering the Great Barrier Reef and utilising Google Maps technology was released in 2011.
 Research and Innovation: The ABS has been undertaking surveys to collect estimates from Australian organizations regarding expenditure on and human resources devoted to research and development (R&D) in Australia since 1978. The results allow the nature and distribution of Australia's R&D activity to be monitored by government policy analysts and advisers to government, businesses and economists.

In August 2017 the treasurer issued a direction to the ABS to undertake a statistical collection into the views of Australians on the electoral roll about same sex marriage. This is now referred to as the Australian Marriage Law Postal Survey.

International engagement
The ABS engages in international and regional statistical forums including United Nations Statistical Commission (UNSC), Organization for Economic Cooperation and Development (OECD) Committee on Statistics and Statistical Policy (CSSP), and United Nations Economic Commission for Europe (UNECE) Conference for European Statisticians (CES).

The ABS has a partnership with DFAT to deliver statistical and institutional capability building programs for the Indo-Pacific region, both in-country and by hosting development visits. The ABS has also hosted international development and study visits from countries including China, Japan, Canada, Korea and Nepal.

Australian Statistician

Since 1975, the head of the ABS has been known as the "Australian Statistician". Previously, the office was titled the "Commonwealth Statistician".

The incumbent since 11 December 2019 is David Gruen. Previous incumbents have included David Kalisch and Brian Pink. Pink retired in January 2014. Ian Ewing acted in the role from 13 January to 14 February 2014 and Jonathan Palmer acted from 17 February to 12 December 2014.

See also
 ANZSIC – Australian and New Zealand standard industrial classification, an industry classification developed jointly with Statistics New Zealand
 Demography of Australia
 SEIFA – Socio-economic indexes for areas, the Australian indexes of social advantage and disadvantage, created by the Australian Bureau of Statistics
 Census and Statistics Act 1905

References

External links
 
 
 Year Book Australia
 "Measuring Australia's Progress"

 
1905 establishments in Australia
Demographics of Australia
Standards of Australia
Government agencies established in 1905
National statistical services